Daniel Pavón (born 26 August 1972) is a Spanish diver. He competed in the men's 10 metre platform event at the 1996 Summer Olympics.

References

External links
 

1972 births
Living people
Spanish male divers
Olympic divers of Spain
Divers at the 1996 Summer Olympics
Sportspeople from the Province of Toledo